Wallace Samuel Gourley (August 4, 1904 – September 23, 1976) was a United States district judge of the United States District Court for the Western District of Pennsylvania.

Education and career

Born in Wellsville, Ohio, Gourley received a Bachelor of Laws from Ohio State University Moritz College of Law in 1929. He was in private practice in Washington, Pennsylvania from 1929 to 1936. He was an Investigator for the Retail Credit Company (now Equifax) in Washington, Pennsylvania from 1929 to 1936. He was first assistant district attorney of Washington County, Pennsylvania from 1936 to 1944. He was a member of the Pennsylvania State Senate from 1941 to 1945.

Federal judicial service

On November 2, 1945, Gourley was nominated by President Harry S. Truman to a seat on the United States District Court for the Western District of Pennsylvania, vacated by Judge Frederic Palen Schoonmaker. Gourley was confirmed by the United States Senate on November 20, 1945, and received his commission on November 29, 1945. He served as Chief Judge from 1951 to 1969 and as a member of the Judicial Conference of the United States from 1968 to 1970, assuming senior status on August 4, 1969. Gourley served in that capacity until his death on September 23, 1976.

References

Sources
 

1904 births
1976 deaths
Pennsylvania state senators
Pennsylvania lawyers
Judges of the United States District Court for the Western District of Pennsylvania
United States district court judges appointed by Harry S. Truman
20th-century American judges
Ohio State University Moritz College of Law alumni
People from Wellsville, Ohio
20th-century American politicians